The 2002 Giro del Trentino was the 26th edition of the Tour of the Alps cycle race and was held on 25 April to 28 April 2002. The race started in Arco and finished in Lienz. The race was won by Francesco Casagrande.

General classification

References

2002
2002 in road cycling
2002 in Italian sport